Never Too Late is a 1962 Broadway play by Sumner Arthur Long.

Never Too Late starred Paul Ford and Maureen O'Sullivan as Harry and Edith Lambert, a middle-aged couple about to become parents once again. Starring as the couple's adult daughter Kate and her husband Charlie Clinton, were Fran Sharon and Orson Bean, as well as Leona Maricle and House Jameson as Grace and James Kimbrough.

Production 
Never Too Late originally opened at the Playhouse Theatre in New York City on November 27, 1962. The play, directed by George Abbott and produced by Elliot Martin and Daniel Hollywood, ran for a total of 1,007 performances until its end on April 24, 1965.

Film 
A film version based on the play was released in November 1965 with Ford and O’Sullivan reprising their Broadway roles.

Awards and nominations

Original Broadway production

References

External links 
 
 

1962 plays
American plays adapted into films
Broadway plays
Plays set in Massachusetts
Works about human pregnancy